Wolf Mail (born 1972) is a Canadian blues rock guitarist and singer. Mail has recorded 6 full-length albums, internationally distributed and has toured in over 26 countries. He is influenced by blues, jazz, soul and country.

Early years
Born in Montreal, Quebec, Canada, and raised in the South of France and California, Mail spent much of his early years traveling. He began playing the guitar at the age of 10, heavily influenced by Elmore James and John Lee Hooker. Later, Mail received some guitar lessons from David Goodman, and went on to perform his first gig at 14. He left home at 17 to tour with his own band.

Career
Mail recorded two independent albums in the mid-'90s before signing up with ZYX records. Since then he has released nine albums.

His first effort, Solid Ground, included the ballad "Hello" which stayed in the best selling music charts in Japan for three weeks and had fans declare their "favourite love song of all time".

Blue Fix followed up which was recorded with the help of the Steve Miller Band

Mail then recorded a live CD and DVD Live Blues in Red Square in Moscow, Russia.

His fourth album Electric Love Soul was recorded in 2009 in LA at Doghouse studios by Grammy Award winner BB "Chung" King, and Robert Cray producer Dennis Walker.

His follow-up The Basement Session was recorded in Sydney, Australia, at the Basement, which has hosted artist such as Prince and Albert Collins.

His sixth album, Above The Influence, was released in October 2013.
Rhythms Music Magazine said it "sees Mail return to where he cut his teeth, our teeth, everyone's teeth – again, searing electric blues."

International

Mail has played several world tours during his career, with Russian and European tours in 2009 and 2010, and Asian and Australian tours in 2010 to 2012. Mail has a global presence and has played to sell-out tours around the world.

Awards and recognition

Player Magazine Japan selected Mail as the "Close-up" artist of the month in June 2005. Other artists have included Robert Cray and Brian Setzer. MusicOz Australia gave Wolf Mail best top 10 international performer of the year award for 2012.

Musical instruments and gear
Wolf uses Mark Gilbert WM1 signature bearing his name and Mark Gilbert BC electro-acoustic guitars and Fender 1957 vintage Telecaster and Greg Bennett Blackbird semi-acoustic guitars. Wolf is endorsed by Carvin amplifier, and was one of the first artists with Joe Walsh to use the Carvin Bel Air vintage series. Wolf has been using the Bel Air since 1993.

Discography
Wolf Mail
2002 – Solid Ground
2004 – Live!Live!Live! (unofficial release).
2005 – Blue Fix
2009 – Live Blues in Red Square
2010 – Electric Love Soul
2011 – The Basement Session
2012 – Soho Strays
2013 – Above The Influence
2015 – Oseana Auditorium

Collaborations
2015 – Blues Christmas (with Leslie West, Eric Gales, Kenny Neal, Pat Travers, Joe Louis Walker, Chris Spedding).
2018 – Live at the Lazy (with Milena Barrett)

DVDs
Live Blues in Red Square was released in 2009, and recorded at the Jazz Town Theater, in Moscow, Russia.
Oseana Auditorium released in 2014 was recorded during Wolf's 2013 tour of Scandinavia, while supporting Blues legend Johnny Winter.

Bibliography
Rock my world Canada by Mike Carr. A reference and collector's guide on Canadian Blues artists.

Record labels
Japan/ Asia – BSMF Records
Europe – ZYX Music
North America – Cleopatra Records

References

External links

 

1972 births
Living people
Blues rock musicians
Canadian blues guitarists
Canadian blues singers
Canadian male guitarists
Musicians from Montreal
Electric blues musicians
21st-century Canadian guitarists
21st-century Canadian male musicians